The station chief, also called chief of station (COS), is the top U.S. Central Intelligence Agency official stationed in a foreign country, equivalent to a KGB Resident. Often the COS has an office in the American Embassy. The station chief is the senior U.S. intelligence representative with his or her respective foreign government.

Those who have been known to be station chiefs include, in alphabetical order:

Bibliography
Edward J. Epstein, Deception. the invisible war between the KGB and the CIA (New York: Simon and Schuster 1989).
David Hoffman, Billion Dollar Spy. A true story of Cold War espionage and betrayal (New York: Doubleday 2015).
Ralph McGehee, Deadly Deceits. My 25 years in the CIA (New York: Sheridan Square 1983).
John Prados, William Colby and the CIA. The secret wars of a controversial spymaster (University of Kansas 2003, 2009).
W. Thomas Smith, Jr., Encyclopedia of the Central Intelligence Agency (New York: Facts on File 2003).
Evan Thomas, The Very Best Men. The daring early years of the CIA (New York: Simon and Schuster 1995, 2006).

References 

Central Intelligence Agency